The Duncan Tunnel (also known as the Edwardsville Tunnel) is a railroad tunnel in Edwardsville, Floyd County, Indiana, USA. The tunnel was initially built for the Air Line, who were unable to find a suitable route over the Floyds Knobs so they decided to tunnel through them. The tunnel was completed by the Southern Railway in 1881 at a total cost of $1 million. It is currently still in use by the Norfolk Southern Railway. The tunnel passes beneath I-64 intersection #118.

References

Transportation buildings and structures in Floyd County, Indiana
Railroad tunnels in Indiana
Norfolk Southern Railway tunnels
Southern Railway (U.S.)
Tunnels completed in 1881
1881 establishments in Indiana